Milt Neil (May 30, 1914 – October 18, 1997), sometimes known as "the Duck Man", was an American animator, toy designer and comics artist.

He was born in New Jersey in 1914. He worked for Disney Studios from 1935 to 1944. He worked on Fantasia, Dumbo, Saludos Amigos, and The Three Caballeros. After leaving Disney he briefly worked for Walter Lantz Productions. He was also active in advertising and redesigned the two mascots of Pea Soup Andersen's. They received their permanent names Hap-Pea and Pea-Wee through a contest.

Neil became involved with the children's show Howdy Doody, for whom he designed puppets and various other merchandising objects. Together with Chad Grothkopf  he adapted the TV show into a newspaper comic between 1950 and 1953, though he only worked on it for the first three months, after which Grothkopf took over.

Neil ran the character animation program at the Joe Kubert School of Cartoon and Graphic Design. He died in 1997.

Sources

American animators
American comics artists
Toy designers
1914 births
1997 deaths
People from New Jersey
Walt Disney Animation Studios people
Walter Lantz Productions people